Rowland Stuart Howard (24 October 1959 – 30 December 2009) was an Australian rock musician, guitarist and songwriter, best known for his work with the post-punk group The Birthday Party and his subsequent solo career.

Early life
Rowland Stuart Howard was born on 24 October 1959 in Melbourne, to John Stanton Howard and Lorraine (née Stuart), the second of three children. His siblings were sister Angela Howard and brother Harry Howard, both also musicians. In a 2016 interview, his brother Harry Howard stated the family is of paternal English descent from Bolton, Lancashire and maternal Scottish descent.

Career

1978–1990
Rowland Stuart Howard wrote "Shivers" at the age of 16 while in the band Young Charlatans. Howard gained acclaim after joining Melbourne-based band The Boys Next Door, when the song was released as a single. The band changed their name to The Birthday Party and Howard's discordant guitar remained a major factor in their sound. The Birthday Party relocated from Australia to London in 1980 and subsequently to West Berlin.

The Birthday Party's early records were released by Missing Link Records in Australia and 4AD Records in the UK. They later became associated with Mute Records in Europe. Howard was also a member of the short-lived project, Tuff Monks with Birthday Party bandmates, Nick Cave and Mick Harvey. However, Howard and singer Nick Cave suffered 'creative differences', and Howard left the Birthday Party as they transformed into The Bad Seeds. He soon became a member of Crime & the City Solution, a band led by Simon Bonney. Howard, with Crime & the City Solution, appeared in the 1987 movie Wings of Desire by German filmmaker Wim Wenders playing the song "Six Bells Chime" in a Berlin Club. Later he formed These Immortal Souls with girlfriend Genevieve McGuckin, brother, Harry Howard, and Epic Soundtracks.

Howard also collaborated with Lydia Lunch, Nikki Sudden, ex-Barracudas singer Jeremy Gluck, guitarist Gavin Poolman, French electro group KaS Product, Barry Adamson, Einstürzende Neubauten, guitarist Chris Haskett, The Gun Club singer and songwriter Jeffrey Lee Pierce, Fad Gadget, Nick Cave and the Bad Seeds, Henry Rollins, and A.C. Marias.

Lydia Lunch and Thurston Moore recorded a version of Howard's song "Still Burning" for Lunch's In Limbo (1984). "Still Burning" had previously been recorded as a bass-heavy track with Howard on vocals, during the Honeymoon In Red recording sessions (1983–1987).

These Immortal Souls released their first album Get Lost, (Don't Lie!) in 1987 and played shows in Europe and America, returning to Australia for a short tour in 1988.

1990–1999
After the release of These Immortal Souls' second album, I'm Never Gonna Die Again, (1992) and another Howard/Lunch collaboration Shotgun Wedding, Howard, Lunch and members of The Beasts Of Bourbon performed live on tour in Australia and Europe with guitarist Link Benka. Shotgun Wedding was re-released with a second compact disc of live recordings. Shotgun Wedding featured cover versions of "In My Time of Dying" and Alice Cooper's "Black Juju". Recorded in Memphis with  Link Benka (rhythm guitar), Joseph -Joe- Drake (bass) and Brent Newman (aka Glyn Styler) (drums).

Howard sang backing vocals on the Nick Cave and the Bad Seeds album Let Love In (1994). In 1995 These Immortal Souls contributed their version of "You Can't Unring a Bell" to a Tom Waits tribute album Step Right Up.

He left London to return to Melbourne in 1995.

Paul Godfrey a.k.a. Epic Soundtracks, the UK drummer for These Immortal Souls, was found dead in his London apartment on 5 November 1997. These Immortal Souls played their last show, at the Greyhound Hotel in St Kilda, with Lydia Lunch in 1998.

Howard lamented in a 1999 television interview (Studio 22, ABCTV) with Clinton Walker that people still asked him about "Shivers", a song he wrote when he was sixteen years old which first became well known when it was sung by Nick Cave.

Howard released a solo album called Teenage Snuff Film in Australia in 1999.

2000–2009

An unofficial Rowland S. Howard fan website was established as the amount of Rowland S. Howard related information and file swapping grew steadily on the internet from the mid-1990s.

Howard made a cameo appearance in the 2002 vampire movie Queen of the Damned as a musician in a vampire club band.

In August 2005, Howard performed at the premiere party for Scott Crary's film Kill Your Idols in Melbourne, Australia, along with the band HTRK.

French label Stagger Records released a double CD tribute album to Howard in 2007 featuring Mick Harvey, The Drones, The Holy Soul, Penny Ikinger, Loene Carmen, Nikki Sudden, Noah Taylor and many more.

In September 2007, Howard joined with Magic Dirt and Beasts of Bourbon for a tour of the east coast of Australia. Howard appeared at the All Tomorrows Parties rock festival in Australia in January 2009, curated by Nick Cave and the Bad Seeds. He was backed by Mick Harvey on drums, and JP Shilo on bass. Howard's second solo album, Pop Crimes, was released in October 2009 to acclaim from the musician Robert Forster.  He appeared on the Magic Dirt EP White Boy playing guitar and supplying vocals on the track "Summer High".

Illness and death
Howard suffered from chronic Hepatitis C virus and had been told in 2003, when he was 44, that his liver was stricken with end-stage cirrhosis. Doctors compared it to the liver of a 74-year-old alcoholic. In an October 2009 interview, Howard said that the forthcoming album he was working on (Pop Crimes) was recorded quickly: "I contracted liver disease a while back and I've basically got liver cancer, I'm waiting for a transplant, if I don't get it things might not go so well...so..." . He died of hepatocellular carcinoma secondary to liver cirrhosis on 30 December 2009. Howard was 50 years old. His funeral was held at Sacred Heart Church, St Kilda, Melbourne on 7 January 2010.

His Birthday Party bandmates reflected upon his death: Nick Cave told WENN, "This is very sad news. Rowland was Australia's most unique, gifted and uncompromising guitarist. He was also a good friend. He will be missed by many". Mick Harvey remarked, "Sometimes people are ready to go because they have been sick for a long time, but Rowland really wanted to live. Things were going well for him outside his health and he wanted to take advantage of that, and he was very disappointed that he wasn't well enough to do so".

Legacy
In October 2011, filmmaker Richard Lowenstein (Dogs in Space) and Lynn-Maree Milburn (We're Living on Dogfood – documentary maker), released a 110-minute documentary film on the life of Rowland S. Howard titled Autoluminescent: Rowland S. Howard which had a limited release for cinema. On 24 April 2013, Port Phillip Council approved a proposal to name a St Kilda laneway Rowland S. Howard Lane to honour Howard's contribution to the St Kilda music scene.
Pop Crimes: The Songs of Rowland S. Howard, an occasional band composed of Rowland's friends and bandmates began performing in 2013; they toured Europe in February 2020. In June 2020, Yves Saint Laurent used his song 'Shut Me Down' for an advertisement campaign.

Band history
Tootho and the Ring of Confidence, with band members including Simon McLean and Clint Small
The Obsessions, with band members including Simon McLean and Graham Pitt
The Young Charlatans, with band members including Ollie Olsen
The Boys Next Door: members Nick Cave, Mick Harvey, Tracy Pew, and Phill Calvert
The Birthday Party, with the same band members
Honeymoon In Red, released as a Lydia Lunch album, Lydia Lunch,  Nick Cave, Mick Harvey, J.G. Thirlwell, Thurston Moore, Murray Mitchell, Tracy Pew, Genevieve McGuckin (Nick Cave and Mick Harvey are uncredited on the album)
Crime & the City Solution, with band members Simon Bonney, Bronwyn Adams, Mick Harvey, Alexander Hacke, Epic Soundtracks, Harry Howard
These Immortal Souls, with band members Genevieve McGuckin, Harry Howard, Epic Soundtracks
Nikki Sudden and the Jacobites
Teenage Snuff Film, (Rowland S. Howard solo album featuring Mick Harvey and Brian Henry Hooper)
Pop Crimes, (Rowland S. Howard's second solo album featuring Mick Harvey, J.P. Shilo and Jonnine Standish of HTRK)

Discography

Solo
 Teenage Snuff Film, (LP, 1999, Reliant Records)
 Pop Crimes, (LP, 2009, Liberation Music)

The Boys Next Door
 Door, Door (LP, 1979)
 Hee Haw (12" EP, 1979)

The Boys Next Door/The Birthday Party
 The Birthday Party (LP 1980). Originally credited to the Boys Next Door. Later re-released and attributed to The Birthday Party.

The Birthday Party
 Prayers on Fire (LP, 1981)
 Junkyard (LP, 1982) (UK No. 73)
 Drunk on the Pope's Blood/The Agony Is the Ecstacy (12" EP; music by Lydia Lunch on one side)
 The Bad Seed (12" EP, 1983)
 Mutiny (12" EP, 1983)

With Lydia Lunch
 Some Velvet Morning (12" EP, 1982)
 Honeymoon In Red (LP, 1987)
 Shotgun Wedding (LP, 1991, Triple X Records, Atavistic Records)
 Transmutation + Shotgun Wedding Live in Siberia (LP, 1994)

Crime and the City Solution
 Just South of Heaven (LP, MiniAlbum, 1985)
 The Dangling Man (12" EP, 1985)
 The Kentucky Click / Adventure (12" EP, 1986)
 Room of Lights (LP, 1986)

These Immortal Souls
 Get Lost (Don't Lie) (LP, 1987)
 I'm Never Gonna Die Again (LP, 1992)

With Nikki Sudden
 Kiss You Kidnapped Charabanc (LP, 1987, Creation Records)
 Wedding Hotel (12" EP, 1987, Creation Records)

Filmography
Wings of Desire, 1987
In Too Deep, 1990
Queen of the Damned, 2002

Documentaries:
We're Living on Dog Food, 2009
Autoluminescent: Rowland S. Howard, 2011

Equipment
Ibanez No. 2348 guitar, a copy of the Firebird model originally made by Gibson. He used it in his early days in the Australian rock scene, while he was member of Young Charlatans and The Boys Next Door, being inspired by Phil Manzanera from Roxy Music.
Fender Jaguar guitar. It was a post-1966 Fender guitar, from the CBS era. Considered as his main guitar, Howard got it in 1978.
Fender Twin Reverb amplifier (1970's model with master volume). Rowland used these amps almost exclusively throughout his career.
MXR Blue Box effects pedal. Many of his trademark distortion excursions were assisted by this guitar pedal.
MXR Distortion + effects pedal.

Production credits
Hungry Ghosts Hungry Ghosts LP (Reliant, 1999)
HTRK Marry Me Tonight LP

Awards

AIR Awards
The Australian Independent Record Awards (commonly known informally as AIR Awards) is an annual awards night to recognise, promote and celebrate the success of Australia's Independent Music sector.

|-
| AIR Awards of 2010
|Pop Crimes  
| Best Independent Album
| 
|-

References

External links

Further reading and bibliography
Extensive archival information on www.burning-heart.net
From Pop to Punk to Postmodernism: Popular Music and Australian Culture from the 1960s to the 1990s, (Edited by Philip Hayward).
Bad Seed: A biography of Nick Cave, Ian Johnston (1995).
NME
Future Pop: Music for the Eighties, Peter Noble (1983)
Stranded: The Secret History of Australian Independent Music 1977–1991, Clinton Walker.
Incriminating Evidence, Lydia Lunch. Last Gasp Books.
Nikki Sudden weblog.
Nikki Sudden quote taken from Nikki Sudden weblog, 23 March 2006.
Tape Delay: Confessions From The Eighties Underground, Charles Neal.
Fast Forward, Tape Zine, Melbourne, edited by Bruce Milne

1959 births
2009 deaths
Deaths from liver cancer
Deaths from cancer in Victoria (Australia)
Australian rock guitarists
Australian record producers
Musicians from Melbourne
Australian people of English descent
Australian people of Scottish descent
Australian punk rock musicians
Australian expatriates in the United Kingdom
Nick Cave and the Bad Seeds members
Post-punk musicians
Fat Possum Records artists
Deaths from hepatitis
The Birthday Party (band) members
Crime & the City Solution members
20th-century guitarists
Atavistic Records artists
Australian male guitarists
20th-century Australian male musicians
20th-century Australian musicians